Samuel Tito Armando was the Ambassador of Angola to Russia in 2008.

References 

Angolan diplomats
Year of birth missing (living people)
Living people
Ambassadors of Angola to Russia
Peoples' Friendship University of Russia alumni
Angolan expatriates in the Soviet Union